Viação Aérea Arco-Íris S.A. was a Brazilian airline founded in 1945. Flight operations ceased in 1948.

History
Arco-Íris was founded in March 1945 and the first flight was operated on July 12, 1946 between São Paulo-Congonhas and cities within the states of São Paulo and Paraná, being the first carrier to serve Londrina.

Due to financial problems the airline ceased operations in 1948. It was later sold to a group of entrepreneurs from Rio Grande do Sul, who moved its head-office to Caxias do Sul, right on the main operational area of Varig. For this reason, the new owners had extreme difficulty in establishing operations. Finally in 1950 Arco-Íris had its operational authorization cancelled.

Destinations
Arco-Íris served the following cities:  
Assis – Assis Airport
Londrina – Londrina Airport
Marília – Marília Airport
Ourinhos – Ourinhos Airport
Presidente Prudente – Presidente Prudente Airport
São Paulo – Congonhas Airport

Fleet

Accidents and incidents
1946: a de Havilland DH-89A Dragon Rapide registration PP-AID crashed upon touch down at São Paulo-Congonhas due to cross-winds. One passenger survived.

See also

List of defunct airlines of Brazil

References

External links

Defunct airlines of Brazil
Airlines established in 1945
Airlines disestablished in 1948